Francisco García Gómez (born 14 February 1938), commonly known as Paquito, is a Spanish retired football midfielder and manager.

Playing career
Paquito was born in Oviedo, Asturias. Over the course of 14 seasons, he played 327 La Liga games in representation of Real Oviedo and Valencia CF, scoring 31 goals. In the 1970–71 campaign, he appeared in 27 matches (all starts) and netted three times as the latter team won their fourth national championship, the first in 24 years.

Paquito earned nine caps for Spain during nearly five years, his debut coming on 1 November 1962 in a 6–0 home win against Romania for the 1964 European Nations' Cup qualifiers.

Coaching career
Paquito coached for more than 30 years, his first job with the professionals being in the 1977–78 season with Real Valladolid (Segunda División, seventh position). He achieved three promotions to the top flight, with Racing de Santander (1993), Rayo Vallecano (1995) and Villarreal CF (2000).

With the latter club, Paquito also worked in directorial capacities, as an assistant manager, youth academy director and head coach of farm team CD Onda.

Honours

Club
Valencia
La Liga: 1970–71
Copa del Generalísimo: 1966–67
Inter-Cities Fairs Cup: 1962–63

International
Spain
UEFA European Championship: 1964

References

External links
 
 
 CiberChe stats and bio 
 
 

1938 births
Living people
Footballers from Oviedo
Spanish footballers
Association football midfielders
La Liga players
Segunda División players
Real Oviedo players
UP Langreo footballers
Valencia CF players
Valencia CF Mestalla footballers
Spain B international footballers
Spain international footballers
1964 European Nations' Cup players
UEFA European Championship-winning players
Spanish football managers
La Liga managers
Segunda División managers
Segunda División B managers
Atlético Madrid B managers
Real Valladolid managers
CD Castellón managers
Hércules CF managers
Valencia CF managers
Cádiz CF managers
UE Figueres managers
UD Las Palmas managers
Racing de Santander managers
Rayo Vallecano managers
CA Osasuna managers
Villarreal CF managers
CF Gandía managers
Valencia CF non-playing staff